{{Infobox Italian comune
| name                = Mazzarino
| official_name       = Comune di Mazzarino
| native_name         = 
| image_skyline       = Mazzarino O Cannuni.jpg
| imagesize           = 
| image_alt           = 
| image_caption       = U Cannuni castle.
| image_shield        = Mazzarino-Stemma.svg
| shield_alt          = 
| shield_size         = 
| image_map           = 
| map_alt             = 
| map_caption         = 
| pushpin_label_position = 
| pushpin_map_alt     = 
| coordinates         = 
| coordinates_footnotes = 
| region              = Sicily
| province            = Caltanissetta (CL)
| frazioni            = 
| mayor_party         = 
| mayor               = Vincenzo Marino
| area_footnotes      = 
| area_total_km2      = 293
| population_footnotes = 
| population_total    = 11900
| population_as_of    = 31 October 2017
| pop_density_footnotes = 
| population_demonym  = Mazzarinesi
| elevation_footnotes = 
| elevation_m         = 553
| twin1               = 
| twin1_country       = 
| saint               = 
| day                 = 
| postal_code         = 93013
| area_code           = 0934
| website             = 
| footnotes           = 
}}

Mazzarino (Sicilian: Mazzarinu''') is a city and comune'' in the province of Caltanissetta in the region of Sicily, Italy.

The city emerged in the second half of the 13th century. In 1507, the lords of the manor received the title Count of Mazzarini.

It is home to two castles.

In the 1950s, the local friary was the stage for the highly debated Mazzarino Friars case.

Twin towns
 Cinisello Balsamo, Italy

Sources

Municipalities of the Province of Caltanissetta
Populated places established in the 13th century
13th-century establishments in Italy